RFD may refer to:

Arts and entertainment
 RFD (magazine), a magazine for rural gay men
 RFD-TV, an American television network

Organizations
 RFD, a safety equipment company founded by Reginald Foster Dagnall
 Rally of Democratic Forces, (Regroupement des forces démocratiques) a political party in Mauritania
 Richmond Fire Department, an emergency services provider in California

Science and technology
 Rear flank downdraft, an area of quickly descending air associated with rotating thunderstorms
 Reduced-function devices, in the low-rate wireless personal area networks standard IEEE 802.15.4
 Reference dose, the US EPA's maximum acceptable oral dose of a toxic substance
 Request for Discussion, similar to Request for Comments; For example, see Usenet newsgroup

Other uses
 Chicago Rockford International Airport (IATA code), US
 Request for Deviation, related to a request for waiver
 Request for Documentation, related to a business request for tender
 Reserve Force Decoration, an Australian military award
 Rural Free Delivery, the postal service to rural areas of the US

See also
 Mayberry R.F.D., a CBS television sitcom (1968–1971)